"Alexandrine" is an adjective largely synonymous with "Alexandrian". It may refer to:

Literature
 An alexandrine, a twelve-syllable line of poetry; exhibiting slightly different characteristics in different languages:
French alexandrine
Polish alexandrine
Czech alexandrine

People
 Alexandrine Le Normant d'Étoilles (1744-1754), daughter of Madame de Pompadour
 Alexandrine of Baden (1820-1904), eldest child of Leopold, Grand Duke of Baden and Sophie of Sweden
 Alexandrine of Mecklenburg-Schwerin (1879-1952), consort of King Christian X of Denmark
 Alexandrine "Alexine" Tinne (1835-1869), Dutch photographer and explorer in Africa
 Alexandrine von Schönerer (1850–1919), Austrian theater owner, managing director and actress
 Princess Alexandrine of Prussia (1803-1892), Grand Duchess of Mecklenburg-Schwerin
 Princess Alexandrine of Prussia (1842-1906), daughter of Prince Albert of Prussia
 Alexandrine-Caroline Branchu (1780-1850), French opera soprano
 Rose-Alexandrine Barreau (1773–1843), French soldier

Other
 Alexandrine parakeet (Psittacula eupatria), a mainly green parrot native to Southeast Asia

See also
Alexandrina (disambiguation)
Alexandrian (disambiguation)